

Group A













Group B



Dorota Bukowska
 Joanna Cupryś
 Patrycja Czepiec
 Katarzyna Dulnik
 Katarzyna Dydek
 Małgorzata Dydek
 Agnieszka Jaroszewicz
 Ilona Mądra
 Beata Predehl
 Krystyna Szymańska-Lara
 Elżbieta Trześniewska
 Sylwia Wlaźlak
Coach: Tomasz Herkt









References

External links
 FIBA Archive

EuroBasket Women 1999
EuroBasket Women squads